The Los Angeles Clippers are an American professional basketball team based in Los Angeles, California. They play in the Pacific Division of the Western Conference in the National Basketball Association (NBA). The Clippers joined the NBA in 1970 as an expansion team. The team has had three names since its inception: the Buffalo Braves (1970–1978), the San Diego Clippers (1978–1984), and the Los Angeles Clippers (1984–present). The Clippers are the oldest franchise in the NBA to have never reached the league finals. The team has played its home games at the Crypto.com Arena (formerly Staples Center) since 1999. The Clippers are owned by Steve Ballmer, and Dave Wohl is their general manager.

There have been 25 head coaches for the Clippers. The franchise's first head coach was Dolph Schayes, who coached for 83 games in two seasons. Mike Dunleavy is the franchise's all-time leader in regular-season games coached (541). Doc Rivers is the franchise's all-time leader in  regular-season games won (307), playoff games coached (46), and playoff games won (22). Jack Ramsay, Larry Brown, Bill Fitch, Mike Dunleavy, Vinny Del Negro,  Doc Rivers, and Tyronn Lue, are the only coaches to have reached the playoffs with the Clippers. Ramsay and Fitch were also named as two of the Top 10 Coaches in NBA History in 1996. Ramsay, Brown and Fitch are the only Clippers coaches to have been elected into the Basketball Hall of Fame as a coach. The most recent head coach of the Clippers is Tyronn Lue.



Key

Coaches

References
General

 

Specific

Lists of National Basketball Association head coaches by team

Head coaches